Westerhof syndrome is a cutaneous condition inherited in an autosomal dominant fashion, characterized by congenital hypopigmented macules.

See also 
 Watson syndrome
 List of cutaneous conditions

References

External links 

Genodermatoses
Genetic disorders with OMIM but no gene
Syndromes affecting the skin